Alfred "Fredy" Rüegg (7 May 1934 – 26 April 2010) was a Swiss racing cyclist. He won the 1960 Tour de Suisse. He was the Swiss National Road Race champion in 1967.

References

External links

1934 births
2010 deaths
Swiss male cyclists
Cyclists from Zürich
Tour de Suisse stage winners